Waleed Mohamed Abdulla Ali Al Hayam (born 3 February 1991 in Muharraq, Bahrain) is Bahraini footballer. He is currently playing for Al-Muharraq in the Bahraini Premier League as a defender. He was called up to the Bahrain national football team at 2011 AFC Asian Cup, hosted by neighboring country Qatar.

References

External links 
 

1991 births
Living people
Bahraini footballers
Bahrain international footballers
Association football midfielders
2011 AFC Asian Cup players
2015 AFC Asian Cup players
2019 AFC Asian Cup players
People from Muharraq
Al-Muharraq SC players
Bahraini Premier League players
AFC Cup winning players